In vivo may refer to:

 In vivo, experimentation using a whole, living organism
 In Vivo (novel), a 1964 novel by Mildred Savage
 In Vivo (EP), a 2003 album by rap group Loco Locass
 In Vivo (band), a pop folk and turbo folk duo from Serbia
 NVivo, a qualitative data analysis software